Bukit Batok MRT station is an above-ground Mass Rapid Transit (MRT) station on the North South line in Bukit Batok, Singapore. Until the opening of the Woodlands Extension, the station was part of the Branch line.

Bukit Batok station is situated within the town centre of Bukit Batok New Town, next to Bukit Batok Bus Interchange.

Etymology
Bukit Batok MRT station is located within the planning area of Bukit Batok, hence its name. The word "bukit" means "hill" in Malay; "batok" could be the Javanese term for coconut, or a corruption of "batu" which means "granite" in Malay, or it could be derived from the Malay word for cough "batok".

During planning stages, the station was called "Bukit Batok South".

History

The station was opened on 10 March 1990 as part of the Branch line, and was given the station number B1. When the Woodlands Extension opened in 1996, the station number was changed to N23, and continued to use it until it adopted its current station number NS2 in 2001.

Installation of half-height screen doors at the station started on 29 June 2010 and operations commenced on 31 August 2010 with Lakeside.

The last North South line station installed with high-volume low-speed fans. With the beginning of operations on 30 November 2012 with Lakeside, this marked the completion of all high-volume low-speed fan installations along the North South line.

References

External links

 

Railway stations in Singapore opened in 1990
Bukit Batok
Mass Rapid Transit (Singapore) stations